Mediacorp Channel 8's television series The Truth Seekers is an investigative series produced by Mediacorp Studios in 2016. A bunch of 'cold case' private investigators look into unsolved cases from years ago and break new ground with the help of scientific and technological advancements. Over the course of their investigations, members of the crime-busting team fall in – and out – of love as they learn other hidden truths about themselves and their comrades.

The show will begin airing on Mediacorp Channel 8 on 28 April 2016 with 23 episodes.

Episodic Guide

See also
List of MediaCorp Channel 8 Chinese Drama Series (2010s)
The Truth Seekers

Lists of Singaporean television series episodes